Llanwrin is a small village in the valley of the Afon Dyfi in Powys about two miles north-east of Machynlleth.

History and background
Historically, it was in the county of Montgomeryshire.

The village is named after its church, dedicated to St. Gwrin, which dates from late medieval times and was last restored in 1864. The nearby historically significant house of Mathafarn dates back to at least 1485.

Once a thriving community with its own Blacksmiths, Public House and village shop, all long since closed, in recent years the village has been a collection of houses stretched along the B4404 road.

Straw man
Llanwrin is known locally, for its various Straw man characters which are located from time to time on the small triangle shaped village green.

References

External links

 Photos of Llanwrin and surrounding area on geograph
 Eco Dyfi Valley Partnership
 Genealogical information about Llanwrin
 Map of Llanwrin in 1837

Villages in Powys
Glantwymyn